Year 1254 (MCCLIV) was a common year starting on Thursday (link will display the full calendar) of the Julian calendar.

Events 
 By place 

 Byzantine Empire 
 Battle of Adrianople: Byzantine forces under Emperor Theodore II (Laskaris) defeat the invading Bulgarians near Andrianople. The young and inexperienced Tsar Michael II Asen (also mentioned Michael I Asen) is caught by surprise and the Bulgarians suffer heavy losses. Michael is wounded during his hasty retreat through the forest.

 Europe 
 May 21 – King Conrad IV, son of the late Emperor Frederick II, dies of malaria at Lavello (southern Italy). With Conrad's death a interregnum begins which no ruler manages to gain undisputed control of Germany. The 22-year-old Manfred, half-brother of Conrad, refuses to surrender Sicily to Pope Innocent IV, and accepts the regency on behalf of Conrad's 2-year-old son Conradin (the Younger). 
 November 2 – German forces under Manfred start an anti-papal revolt against Innocent IV and seize Lucera in the Tavoliere Plains. He defeats the papal army at Foggia and gains the loyalty of Apulia, on December 2.
 King Afonso III (the Boulonnais) holds the first session of the Cortes (Portugal's general assembly composed of nobles, members of the middle class and representatives from all municipalities), in Leiria.
 William II, anti-king of Germany, holds a diet (princely convention) at Worms, in which the German cities are represented for the first time. He give orders to build strong castles in Heemskerk and Haarlem.
 Doge Reniero Zeno sends the Horses of Saint Mark, looted from Constantinople during the Fourth Crusade, to Venice, where they are installed on the terrace of the façade of St. Mark's Basilica.

 England 
 King Henry III grants his eldest son Edward (the Lord Edward) areas of land including crown lands in Wales, Ireland, the Channel Islands and Gascony. He is also given the cities of Bristol, Stamford and Grantham. The reason for these concessions is to give Edward experience of governing lands of his own before becoming a king. Edward is granted the Three Castles in Wales, Skenfrith Castle, White Castle and Grosmont Castle.
 Summer – Edward (the Lord Edward) travels from Portsmouth with his mother, Queen Eleanor of Provence, and Boniface of Savoy, archbishop of Canterbury, to marry the 13-year-old Eleanor of Castile. She is the half-sister of King Alfonso X (the Wise). In August, they arrive in Burgos, capital of Castile, where the marriage is due to take place.
 November 1 – Edward marries Eleanor of Castile in the Cistercian monastery Las Huelgas at Burgos. Henry III has demanded the marriage, in exchange for ending the war with half-brother Alfonso X.

 Levant 
 February 21 – King Louis IX (the Saint) signs a multi-year truce with An-Nasir Yusuf, Ayyubid ruler of Damascus, who is well aware of a Mongol threat and has no wish for war with the Crusader States. 
 April 24 – Louis IX and his family sails from Acre to France. His boat is nearly wrecked off the coast of Cyprus and later nearly destroyed by fire. In July, the royal party arrives at Hyères in Provence.

 Asia 
 January 4 – William of Rubruck, Flemish missionary and explorer, is received courteously with an embassy at Karakorum. He is given an audience with Möngke Khan, who is loaded with gifts and letters from Louis IX.

 By topic 

 Cities and Towns 
 June 12 – The Dutch city of Alkmaar obtains city rights from William II, anti-king of Germany.
 The Danish city of Copenhagen receives its city charter from Bishop Jacob Erlandsen.

 Commerce 
 The Rhenish League, a confederation of trading cities, is established in the Rhineland, Western Germany. The league (or Städtebund) comprises 59 cities.

 Literature 
 The Japanese classic text Kokon Chomonjū is completed during the Kamakura Period under the reign of the 11-year-old Emperor Go-Fukakusa.

 Markets 
 As part of an offensive against usury in north-western Europe, Innocent IV relieves the city of Beauvais from its obligations to its creditors.

 Religion 
 December 7 – Innocent IV dies after a pontificate of 11-year. He is succeeded by Alexander IV as the 181st pope of the Catholic Church.
 The construction of the Cathedral of Saint Martin is initiated by Henry I van Vianden, bishop of Utrecht.
 The Catholic dogma of purgatory is clarified and named by the Catholic Church (approximate date).

Births 
 March 27 – Hkun Law, Burmese ruler of Martaban (d. 1311)
 May 4 – Benvenuta Bojani, Italian nun and mystic (d. 1292)
 May 13 – Marie of Brabant, queen of France (d. 1322)
 June 24 – Floris V, count of Holland and Zeeland (d. 1296)
 September 15 – Marco Polo, Venetian explorer (d. 1324)
 Beatrice of Castile, marchioness of Montferrat (d. 1286)
 Benedict, Swedish prince, nobleman and knight (d. 1291)
 Bonacossa Borri (or Bonaca), Italian noblewoman (d. 1321)
 Charles II (the Lame), son of Charles I of Anjou (d. 1309)
 Fujiwara no Tamekane, Japanese official and poet (d. 1332)
 Gerhard II (the Blind), German nobleman and knight (d. 1312)
 Nijō Morotada, Japanese nobleman and official (d. 1341)
 Osman I, founding ruler of the Ottoman Empire (d. 1324)
 Ren Renfa (or Ziming), Chinese artist and politician (d. 1327)
 Roger de Mowbray, English nobleman and knight (d. 1297)
 Tetsugyū Enshin, Japanese monk and scholar (d. 1326)  
 Zhao Mengfu, Chinese scholar and calligrapher (d. 1322)

Deaths 
 March 28 – William de Ferrers, English nobleman (b. 1193)
 May 21 – Conrad IV, king of Germany en Sicily (b. 1228)
 June 3 – Andrea Caccioli, Italian friar and priest (b. 1194)
 June 8 – Robert of Nantes, Latin patriarch of Jerusalem
 June 17 – Ingeborg Eriksdotter, Swedish princess (b. 1212)
 August 6 – Hugh of Northwold, English abbot and bishop
 September 25 – William III de Cantilupe, English nobleman 
 November 3 
 John III (Doukas Vatatzes), Byzantine emperor
 Manuel II, Byzantine patriarch of Constantinople
 November 11 – Gil Torres, Spanish archdeacon and cardinal
 December 1 – Abel de Gullane (or Golynn), Scottish bishop
 December 7 – Innocent IV, pope of the Catholic Church
 Berthold of Pietengau, German prince-bishop of Passau
 Faris al-Din Aktai, Egyptian nobleman and emir (prince)
 Peter Chaceporc, English archdeacon and ambassador
 Rudolf von Ems, German knight, poet and writer (b. 1200)
 Silvester de Everdon, English bishop and Lord Chancellor
 Bab Bachir, spouse of last Abbasid caliph al-Musta'sim.

References